Commercial tobacco smoke is a mixture of more than 5,000 chemicals. According to the U.S. Department of Health and Human Services, the following are known human carcinogens found in cigarette smoke:

See also 
 Composition of electronic cigarette aerosol
 Health effects of tobacco smoking
 List of additives in cigarettes

References 

Carcinogens
Tobacco smoke carcinogens
Chemistry-related lists

Health-related lists
Lists of ingredients
Health effects of tobacco